Letts may refer to:

People
Arthur Letts, English-born millionaire developer of Holmby Hills, Los Angeles, California
Barry Letts (born 1925), British actor, television director and producer
Billie Letts (née Gipson; 1938–2014), American novelist and educator
 David Vanian (born David Letts, 1956), English punk rock musician
Don Letts (born 1956), British film director and musician
E. A. Letts (Edmund Albert Letts; 1852–1918), English chemist
Elizabeth Letts (born 1961), American author
F. Dickinson Letts (Fred Dickinson Letts; 1875–1965), United States Representative from Iowa (1925–1931), and a United States District Judge of the United States District Court for the District of Columbia (1931–1965)
Goff Letts, Australian politician
 Letts Executive, Northern Territory
John Letts (publisher) (1929–2006), English publisher
Ken Letts (Kenneth John Letts), Archdeacon of France from 2007 to 2012
Michael Letts (born 1985), Australian–Filipino rugby union player 
Quentin Letts (born 1963), British journalist
Richard Letts (born 1935), music advocate and administrator
Rosemary Letts (born 1953), British serial killer better known by her married name Rosemary West
Tracy Letts (born 1965), American playwright and actor
Winifred Mary Letts (1882–1972), English-born writer, with Irish connections

Other uses
 Letts, known also as Latvians, the indigenous people of Latvia
 Letts nitrile synthesis, chemical reaction 
 Letts of London, a brand owned by the Letts Filofax Group Ltd, British stationery manufacturer and publisher, best known for diaries and Filofax
Letts and Lonsdale, British educational publisher
 Letts, Indiana, United States
 Letts, Iowa, United States